Amory Bloch Lovins (born November 13, 1947) is an American writer, physicist, and former chairman/chief scientist of the Rocky Mountain Institute. He has written on energy policy and related areas for four decades, and served on the US National Petroleum Council, an oil industry lobbying group, from 2011 to 2018.

Lovins has promoted energy efficiency, the use of renewable energy sources, and the generation of energy at or near the site where the energy is actually used. Lovins has also advocated a "negawatt revolution" arguing that utility customers don't want kilowatt-hours of electricity; they want energy services. In the 1990s, his work with Rocky Mountain Institute included the design of an ultra-efficient automobile, the Hypercar. He has provided expert testimony and published 31 books, including Reinventing Fire, Winning the Oil Endgame, Small is Profitable, Brittle Power, and Natural Capitalism.

Early life and education
Lovins was born in Washington, DC. His father, Gerald H. Lovins worked as an engineer and his mother, Miriam Lovins, worked as a social services administrator. Lovins is the brother of Julie Beth Lovins, a computational linguist who wrote the first stemming algorithm for word matching. 

In 1964, Lovins entered Harvard College as a National Merit Scholar. After two years there, he transferred to Oxford. In 1969, he became a junior research fellow at Merton College, Oxford, as a result of which he had a temporary Oxford master of arts status. He left without a degree in 1971, because the university would not allow him to pursue a doctorate in energy. Lovins moved to London to pursue his energy work, and returned to the United States in 1981. He settled in western Colorado in 1982.

Lovins' four grandparents emigrated to the United States from small villages lying between Kyiv and Odessa in Ukraine in the early 20thcentury.  Most of his remaining family are believed to have been killed by German Nazis in the 1941 Tarashcha massacre.

Work

Friends of the Earth 
Each summer from 1965 to 1981, Lovins guided mountaineering trips and photographed the White Mountains of New Hampshire, contributing photographs to At Home in the Wild: New England's White Mountains.  In 1971, he wrote about Wales' endangered Snowdonia National Park in the book, Eryri, the Mountains of Longing, commissioned by David Brower, president of Friends of the Earth. Lovins spent about a decade as British representative for Friends of the Earth.

During the early 1970s, Lovins became interested in resource policy, especially energy policy. The 1973 energy crisis helped create an audience for his writing and an essay originally penned as a U.N. paper grew into his first book concerned with energy, World Energy Strategies (1973).  His next book was Non-Nuclear Futures: The Case for an Ethical Energy Strategy (1975), co-authored with John H. Price.

Rocky Mountain Institute 
By 1978, Lovins had published six books and consulted widely.  In 1982, he and his wife, Hunter Lovins founded Rocky Mountain Institute, based in Snowmass, Colorado.  Together with a group of colleagues, the Lovinses fostered efficient resource use and sustainable development.

Lovins clients have included many Fortune 500 companies, real-estate developers, and utilities. Public-sector clients have included the OECD, UN, Resources for the Future, many national governments, and 13 US states. Lovins served in 1980 and 1981 on the U.S. Department of Energy's Energy Research Advisory Board, and from 1999 to 2001 and 2006 to 2008 on Defense Science Board task forces on military energy efficiency and strategy. His visiting academic chairs most recently included a visiting professorship in Stanford University's School of Engineering.

Since 1982, RMI has grown into a broad-based "think-and-do tank" with more than 85 staff and an annual budget of some $13 million. RMI has spun off five for-profit companies.

Ideas

Soft energy paths 

Amory Lovins published an article in Foreign Affairs called "Energy Strategy: The Road Not Taken?" in 1976. Lovins argued that the United States had arrived at an important crossroads and could take one of two paths. The first, supported by U.S. policy, promised a future of steadily increasing reliance on fossil fuels and nuclear fission, and had serious environmental risks. The alternative, which Lovins called "the soft path", favored "benign" sources of renewable energy like wind power and solar power, along with a heightened commitment to energy conservation and energy efficiency. In October 1977, The Atlantic ran a cover story on Lovins' ideas.  Residential solar energy technologies are prime examples of soft energy technologies and rapid deployment of simple, energy conserving, residential solar energy technologies is fundamental to a soft energy strategy.

Lovins has described the "hard energy path" as involving inefficient energy use and centralized, non-renewable energy sources such as fossil fuels. He believes soft path impacts are more "gentle, pleasant and manageable," than hard path impacts.  These impacts range from the individual and household level to those affecting the very fabric of society at the national and international level.

Lovins on the Soft Path is a documentary film made by Amory and Hunter Lovins. It received "Best Science and Technology Film, San Francisco International Film Festival, 1983; Blue Ribbon, American Film Festival, 1982; Best of the Festival, Environmental Education Film Festival, 1982; Best Energy Film, International Environmental Film Festival, 1982; and Chris Bronze Plaque, Columbus International Film Festival, 1982."

Nuclear power limitations 
Lovins wrote that nuclear power plants are intermittent in that they will sometimes fail unexpectedly, often for long periods of time. For example, in the United States, 132 nuclear plants were built, and 21% were permanently and prematurely closed due to reliability or cost problems, while another 27% have at least once completely failed for a year or more. The remaining U.S. nuclear plants produce approximately 90% of their full-time full-load potential, but even they must shut down (on average) for about 1 out of each 18 months for scheduled refueling and maintenance. To cope with such intermittence by nuclear (and centralized fossil-fueled) power plants, utilities install a "reserve margin" of roughly 15% extra capacity spinning ready for instant use.

Lovins also argues that nuclear plants have an additional disadvantage: for safety, they must instantly shut down in a power failure, but due to the inherent nuclear-physics of the systems, they can't be restarted quickly. For example, during the Northeast Blackout of 2003, nine operating U.S. nuclear units had to shut down temporarily.  During the first three days after restarting, their output was less than 3% of normal.  After twelve days of restart, their average capacity loss had exceeded 50 percent.

Lovins provided his general assessment of nuclear power in a 2011 Huffington Post article, saying that "Nuclear power is the only energy source where mishap or malice can kill so many people so far away; the only one whose ingredients can help make and hide nuclear bombs; the only climate solution that substitutes proliferation, accident, and high-level radioactive waste dangers. Indeed, nuclear plants are so slow and costly to build that they reduce and retard climate protection". With respect to the 2011 Japanese nuclear accidents, Lovins wrote: "An earthquake-and-tsunami zone crowded with 127 million people is an unwise place for 54 reactors".

Regarding nuclear power in the United Kingdom, Amory Lovins commented in 2014 that:

Britain's plan for a fleet of new nuclear power stations is ... unbelievable ... It is economically daft. The guaranteed price [being offered to French state company EDF] is over seven times the unsubsidized price of new wind in the US, four or five times the unsubsidized price of new solar power in the US. Nuclear prices only go up. Renewable energy prices come down. There is absolutely no business case for nuclear. The British policy has nothing to do with economic or any other rational base for decision making.

Negawatt revolution 

A negawatt is a unit in watts of power saved. It is basically the opposite of a watt. Amory Lovins has advocated a "negawatt revolution", arguing that utility customers don't want kilowatt-hours of electricity; they want energy services such as hot showers, cold beer, lit rooms, and spinning shafts, which can come more cheaply if electricity is used more efficiently.

Hypercar 
In 1994, Amory Lovins developed the design concept of the Hypercar.  This vehicle would have ultra-light construction with an aerodynamic body using advanced composite materials, low-drag design, and hybrid drive.  Designers of the Hypercar claim that it would achieve a three- to fivefold improvement in fuel economy, equal or better performance, safety, amenity, and affordability, compared with today's cars.

In 1999, RMI took this process a step further by launching a for-profit venture, Hypercar Inc. in which RMI has a minority interest. In 2004, Hypercar Inc. changed its name to Fiberforge to better reflect the company's new goal of lowering the cost of high-volume advanced-composite structures by leveraging the patents of David F. Taggart, one of the founders of Hypercar, Inc.

Lovins says the commercialization of the Hypercar began in 2014, with the production of the all-carbon electric BMW i3 family and the 313 miles per gallon Volkswagen XL1.

Citizen participation 
Lovins does not see his energy ideas as green or left-wing, and he is an advocate of private enterprise and free market economics. He notes that Rupert Murdoch has made News Corporation carbon-neutral, with savings of millions of dollars. But, says Lovins, large institutions are becoming more "gridlocked and moribund", and he supports the rise of "citizen organizations" around the world.

Paul Hawken's Blessed Unrest chronicles the rise of millions of non-profit citizen organizations around the world — the greatest social movement in history. As central institutions become more gridlocked and moribund, a new vitality is beginning to spread renewal through the stem to the flower.

Criticism 
Institutions and energy specialists have criticized various positions taken by Amory Lovins. One of the main points of contention is the assumption by the RMI of a linear relation between improvements in energy efficiency and reductions in aggregate energy consumption.  The Jevons Paradox suggests that improvements in energy efficiency actually lead to an increase in energy use, as a result of decreasing cost. This "rebound effect" is downplayed in the analyses performed by Lovins.

Other assumptions made by Lovins have also received criticism. For example, in Lovins' book, Reinventing Fire, it is assumed that 50% of all electricity in the US could come from wind in 2050. Other authors find that this is capped probably around 30%. Similar overestimates are identified in PV (solar), where estimates are made for about 30%; this is seen as implausible. Moreover, according to the authors, no analyses are given about the need for huge volumes of electricity storage, which would be needed when the sun doesn't shine and the wind doesn't blow.

Awards 
Amory Lovins was elected a Fellow of the American Association for the Advancement of Science in 1984, of the World Academy of Art and Science in 1988, and of the World Business Academy in 2001. He has received the Right Livelihood Award, the Blue Planet Prize, Volvo Environment Prize, the 4th Annual Heinz Award in the Environment in 1998, and the National Design (Design Mind), Jean Meyer, and Lindbergh Awards.

Lovins is also the recipient of the Time Hero for the Planet awards, the Benjamin Franklin and Happold Medals, and the Shingo, Nissan, Mitchell, and Onassis Prizes. He received a MacArthur Fellowship in 1993, and is an honorary member of the American Institute of Architects (AIA), a Foreign Member of the Royal Swedish Academy of Engineering Sciences, and an Honorary Senior Fellow of the Design Futures Council. He is on the Advisory Board of the Holcim Foundation.

In 2009, Time magazine named Lovins as one of the world's 100 most influential people.

On March 17, 2016, Lovins received the Bundesverdienstkreuz 1. Klasse (Officer's Cross of the Order of Merit) from the Federal Republic of Germany for intellectually underpinning Germany's Energiewende, most notably with his concept of "soft energy" and how that promotes peace and prosperity.

Lovins was a senior Ashoka Fellow in 2009.

Personal life 
In 1979 Amory Lovins married L. Hunter Sheldon, a lawyer, forester, and social scientist.  They separated in 1989 and divorced in 1999. In 2007, he married Judy Hill, a fine-art landscape photographer.

Books 
This is a list of books which are authored or co-authored by Amory B. Lovins:
 World Energy Strategies: Facts, Issues, and Options London : Friends of the Earth Ltd. for Earth Resources Research Ltd., 1975. .
 The Energy Controversy: Soft Path Questions and Answers (1979) 
 Non-Nuclear Futures: The Case for an Ethical Energy Strategy (with John H. Price)  San Francisco, 1980. 
 Least-Cost Energy: Solving the CO2 Problem  Andover, Mass. : Brick House Pub. Co., 1982  
 Brittle Power: Energy Strategy for National Security (with L Hunter Lovins) Andover, Mass. : Brick House, 1982 re-released in 2001. 
 The First Nuclear World War (with Patrick O'Heffernan; L Hunter Lovins)  New York : Morrow, 1983. 
 Reinventing Electric Utilities: Competition, Citizen Action, and Clean Power (1996) 
 Factor Four: Doubling Wealth – Halving Resource Use: A Report to the Club of Rome (1997) 
 Natural Capitalism (2000) 
 Small Is Profitable (2003) 
 The Natural Advantage Of Nations: Business Opportunities, Innovation And Governance in the 21st Century (2004) 
 Let the Mountains Talk, Let the Rivers Run: A Call to Save the Earth (2007) 

Non-English
 Faktor vier. Doppelter Wohlstand – halbierter Verbrauch (1997) 
 Facteur 4: Rapport au Club de Rome (1997) 
 Öko-Kapitalismus: Die industrielle Revolution des 21. Jahrhunderts (2002)

See also 

 Anti-nuclear movement in the United States
 Energy security and renewable technology
 Hermann Scheer
 Mark Z. Jacobson
 Renewable energy commercialization

References

External links 

 The Rocky Mountain Institute's home page
 The frugal cornucopian
 Congressional testimony on nuclear power
 Amory Lovin's presentation to the Berlin Energy Transition Dialogue 2016, March 17–18, 2016

1947 births
Alumni of Magdalen College, Oxford
American business writers
American environmentalists
American non-fiction environmental writers
21st-century American physicists
Appropriate technology advocates
Fellows of Magdalen College, Oxford
Harvard College alumni
Living people
MacArthur Fellows
People associated with energy
Renewable energy commercialization
American anti–nuclear power activists
Fellows of the American Association for the Advancement of Science
Officers Crosses of the Order of Merit of the Federal Republic of Germany
Ashoka USA Fellows